Surface plot may refer to:

 Surface plot (mathematics), a graph of a function of two variables
 Surface plot (radar)